Raclette du Valais or Walliser Raclette (German) is a semi-hard cheese that is usually fashioned into a wheel of about 6 kg (13 lb). The Alpine cow milk based dairy product is most commonly used for melting for the dish called raclette, but is also consumed as is.

Raclette cheese is native to Valais and benefits from an AOP. Non-AOP versions are made in various regions and countries of the world, including Switzerland, France (Savoy, Franche-Comté, Auvergne, Brittany), Luxembourg, Austria, Germany, Finland, United Kingdom, Australia, Canada  and the United States.

See also

Culinary Heritage of Switzerland

References

Cow's-milk cheeses
Culinary Heritage of Switzerland
Swiss cheeses